Gymnasium Karlovac, sometimes historically referred to as Higher Real Gymnasium, is a secondary school (gymnasium) located in the city of Karlovac in Croatia.

Description
Housed in a dedicated building constructed in 1863, the school considers itself to have been founded as early as 1766. At that time, Karlovac was part of the Croatian Military Frontier under the rule of the Austrian Empire. Starting in 1766 and under the direction of Maria Theresa of Austria, piarists were sent to Karlovac to teach subjects to two grade levels, the main subject being the Latin language.

In early 2010 the gymnasium was accepted as the 37th member of the German global school network in Croatia. This designation allows students to attend German universities without having to complete the usual prerequisite German language entrance examination.

Notable alumni

The inventor, electrical and mechanical engineer Nikola Tesla, who attended the school from 1870 until 1873 (age of 14 to 17), attributes his interest in electricity to what he learned at Karlovac. In his 1919 autobiography My Inventions he wrote that demonstrations by his "professor of physics" sparked his interest in this "mysterious phenomena" and made him want "to know more of this wonderful force". Stricken with malaria shortly after his arrival in the mosquito-infested swampy lowlands of Karlovac, he was bedridden at times and often took his school books home to read and memorize when he was unable to attend class. He graduated with honours from the four-year course in only three years.

Other notable alumni includes artist
Pavle Stanimirovic  son of Vojislav Stanimirovic also has attended Karlovac Gimnazium after Swiss 1997 boarding school. 
Other notable alumni include actress Zrinka Cvitešić, poet and writer Ivan Goran Kovačić, politician and founder of the Croatian Peasant Party Stjepan Radić and explorers and brothers Mirko and Stjepan Seljan.

Notable teachers

 Martin Sekulić

References

Notes

Bibliography

External links
  

Gymnasiums in Croatia
Schools in Croatia
Educational institutions established in 1766
Buildings and structures in Karlovac County
Karlovac